Turkey sent a delegation to compete at the 1998 Winter Olympics in Nagano, Japan from 7–22 February 1998.  This was Turkey's 12th time appearing at a Winter Olympic Games.  The Turkish delegation to Nagano consisted of a single alpine skier, Arif Alaftargil.  In the men's slalom, he finished in 29th place.

Background
The Turkish Olympic Committee was recognized by the International Olympic Committee on 1 January 1911.  They have participated in almost every Summer Olympic Games since, except for 1920, 1932, and the boycotted 1980 Summer Olympics.  Since their first Winter Olympics participation at the 1936 Winter Olympics, Turkey has only missed three editions of the Winter Games, the 1952, 1972, and the 1980 Winter Olympics. Nagano was Turkey's 12th appearance at a Winter Olympics.  The 1998 Winter Olympics were held from 7–22 February 1998; a total of 2,176 athletes took part, representing 72 National Olympic Committees.  The Turkish delegation to Nagano consisted of a single alpine skier, Arif Alaftargil.  He was chosen as the flag bearer for the opening ceremony.

Alpine skiing

Arif Alaftargil was 24 years old at the time of the Nagano Olympics, and was making his Olympic debut.  In the two-run men's slalom, held on 21 February, he finished the first run in a time of 1 minute and 12.36 seconds.  He completed the second run in a similar time of 1 minute and 12.73 seconds, making his combined time 2 minutes and 25.09 seconds.  This placed him 29th, out of 31 skiers who finished both legs of the race; however over 30 skiers failed to finish both runs.  The gold medal was won in 1 minute and 49.31 seconds by Hans Petter Buraas of Norway, the silver by fellow Norwegian Ole Kristian Furuseth, and the bronze was taken by Thomas Sykora of Austria.

References

Nations at the 1998 Winter Olympics
1998
1998 in Turkish sport